Renan Fernandes Garcia (born June 19, 1986 in Batatais) is a Brazilian football midfielder for Batatais.

Career

Sampdoria
On 30 January 2012, Renan signed for Sampdoria for €3.2 million. Previously, the Genovese club paid CFR Cluj €1 million for the player's loan. On 1 December 2013, he scored his first goal against F.C. Internazionale Milano.

Honours
Atlético Mineiro
Campeonato Brasileiro Série B: 2006
Campeonato Mineiro: 2007
CFR Cluj
Liga I: 2011–12
Al Nasr
UAE President's Cup: 2014–15
UAE League Cup: 2014–15

References

External links
  Soccerway profile
  Romaniansoccer profile

1986 births
Living people
Footballers from São Paulo (state)
Brazilian footballers
Brazilian expatriate footballers
Clube Atlético Mineiro players
Santa Cruz Futebol Clube players
RC Celta de Vigo players
Sport Club do Recife players
Fortaleza Esporte Clube players
Vitória S.C. players
S.C. Beira-Mar players
CFR Cluj players
U.C. Sampdoria players
Al-Nasr SC (Dubai) players
Emirates Club players
Batatais Futebol Clube players
Campeonato Brasileiro Série A players
Segunda División players
Primeira Liga players
Liga I players
Serie B players
Serie A players
Expatriate footballers in Spain
Expatriate footballers in Portugal
Expatriate footballers in Romania
Expatriate footballers in Italy
Brazilian expatriate sportspeople in Spain
Brazilian expatriate sportspeople in Portugal
Brazilian expatriate sportspeople in Romania
Brazilian expatriate sportspeople in Italy
UAE Pro League players
Association football midfielders